The Orion String Quartet is a string quartet formed in 1987.  It is the quartet-in-residence of New York's Mannes College The New School for Music. The members are Todd and Daniel Phillips, brothers who alternate on first and second violin, violist Steven Tenenbom and cellist Timothy Eddy. Members of the quartet teach at the Curtis Institute of Music, Mannes, Juilliard, Queens College, and the Bard College Conservatory of Music.

External links 
 Orion String Quartet Website

Musical groups established in 1987
American instrumental musical groups
American string quartets